Sybil Lorina Bauer (September 18, 1903 – January 31, 1927) was an American competition swimmer, Olympic champion, and former world record-holder. She represented the United States at the 1924 Summer Olympics, where she won the gold medal in the 100-meter backstroke.

Bauer was born in Chicago, Illinois, the daughter of Norwegian immigrant parents. She graduated from Schurz High School in Chicago.  Afterward, she attended Northwestern University in nearby Evanston, Illinois.  From 1921 to 1926, she set 23 world records in women's swimming, mostly in backstroke events.  During a 1922 meet in Bermuda, she also became the first woman to break a men's record, finishing the 440-yard backstroke in a time of 6:24.8 (about four seconds ahead of the old mark).  However, that record was unofficial, since it took place at an unsanctioned contest.

Bauer represented the United States at the 1924 Summer Olympics in Paris, where she won the gold medal in the women's 100-meter backstroke.  She finished with a time of 1:23.2, four seconds ahead of silver medalist Phyllis Harding.

Bauer was engaged to future television host Ed Sullivan, but she died of cancer during her senior year of college at the age of 23. She was inducted into the International Swimming Hall of Fame as an "Honor Swimmer" in 1967.  Bauer is buried at Mount Olive Cemetery in Chicago.

See also
 List of members of the International Swimming Hall of Fame

References

1903 births
1927 deaths
American female backstroke swimmers
American people of Norwegian descent
Deaths from cancer in Illinois
Medalists at the 1924 Summer Olympics
Northwestern Wildcats women's swimmers
Olympic gold medalists for the United States in swimming
Swimmers from Chicago
Swimmers at the 1924 Summer Olympics
Carl Schurz High School alumni
20th-century American women